The Moving Picture Man is a 1977 Venezuelan drama film directed by Luis Armando Roche. It was entered into the 10th Moscow International Film Festival.

Cast
 Juliet Berto
 Domingo Del Castillo
 Freddy Galavís
 Asdrúbal Meléndez as Jacinto
 Alvaro Roche as Manuel

References

External links
 

1977 films
1977 drama films
Venezuelan drama films
1970s Spanish-language films